is a Japanese folk duo formed in 1974 by  and . The artists were previously part of the Kansai folk group Akaitori (赤い鳥), which was known for its unique sound blending light rock with choral harmonies. Their style is characterized by interpretations of traditional songs with arrangements using contemporary sounds and rhythms. Kamifūsen is active in the Kansai region of Japan and have recorded internationally in Santa Monica, California, and Toronto, Canada.

History 
Kamifūsen's music was inspired by Peter, Paul & Mary, who had a strong influence on the 1970s Japanese folk movement. Gotō and Hirayama first formed a duo in 1967, when they were both in the second year of university. As they added more members, they formed Akaitori, which means "red bird", in 1969.

Akaitori 
Akaitori was discovered by producer Kunihiko Murai (村井邦彦) after winning the 1969 Yamaha Light Music Contest Grand Prix Award for "Takeda's Lullaby." Making their formal debut in 1970, the folk group became best known for the hit single "Tsubasa wo Kudasai", which became the official song of the Japan Football Association when Japan made its first appearance at the World Cup in France. After disbanding in August 1974, former members formed Kamifūsen, Hi-Fi Set, and Humming Bird.

Kamifūsen (1974 to 1991) 
In September 1974, Gotō and Hirayama started Kamifūsen, continuing to perform "Tsubasa wo Kudasai", which became part of the standard choral repertoire in elementary schools. In 1977, Kamifūsen had their first major hit "Before Winter Comes", which became a signature song for the group.

Kamifūsen released nine albums between 1974 and 1986; seven of them were recorded in Japan, while Here With Me was recorded in Santa Monica, California, and Echo Of Love in Toronto, Canada. Here With Me (1984) was produced by Henry Lewy, featuring the original song "Cherry Blossom" written by Peter Yarrow and a Japanese cover version of a Carmine Coppola theme from The Outsiders soundtrack. Echo Of Love (1986) featured musicians from The Anne Murray Band.

TSU-BA-SA 
After releasing the albums Angel On The Roof (1990) and TIME (1991), they returned to work as Kamifūsen.

Kamifūsen (1993 to present) 
Kamifūsen released seven albums from 1993 to present. Live performances included recitals at Osaka Central Public Hall, Osaka Theater Drama City, Osaka Sankei Hall Breeze, and Hyogo Performing Arts Center. In 2019, Kamifūsen held their "45th Anniversary Concert - 50th Anniversary Recital from Red Bird" at Yomiuri Ōtemachi Hall in Tokyo.

Personal 
Gotō and Hirayama were classmates at Amagasaki Kita High School in Hyōgo Prefecture. They were reunited after starting university, when they were both interested in traditional songs, and developed a connection. The couple were married at the age of 20 while part of Akaitori.

Hirayama has appeared as a radio show host for several decades. In 2005, Gotō appeared as a lecturer on NHK Educational TV 's Shumi Yūyū (趣味悠々).

Discography

Albums 

 1974: We Became Two Again (またふたりになったね)
 1976: Love and Freedom (愛と自由を)
 1978: Reunion -A New Journey- (再会 -新たなる旅立ち-)
 1979: Friends (フレンズ)
 1982: Tomodachi ~ Poetry of the World of Chihiro Iwasaki ~ (ともだち 〜いわさきちひろの世界を詩う〜)
 1983: Someday Together (いつか二人で)
 1984: HERE WITH ME
 1986: ECHO OF LOVE
 2000: Saintjeum
 2001: Blue Sky and Sea (青空と海)

With TSU-BA-SA 

 1991: Angel On The Roof
 1992: TIME

Singles 

 1974: "Ikatsuri Uta (いかつり唄 )"
 1974: "Something Good is Going to Happen (何かいいことありそうな)"
 1975: "Sasabune (ささぶね)"
 1975: "White Construction Paper (白い画用紙)"
 1975: "Farewell Bell (別れの鐘)"
 1976: "Love and Freedom (愛と自由を)"
 1976: "Boy's Day (少年の日)"
 1977: "Before Winter Comes (冬が来る前に)"
 1978: "Even If it Gets Wet with Fog (霧にぬれても)"
 1978: "Who Should I Tell... (誰に告げようか…)"
 1979: "A Loving Farewell (愛ある別れ)"
 1979: "I Was Born (僕は生まれた)"
 1980: "Maruyama River Funauta (円山川舟唄)"
 1980: "Showa Modori Bridge (昭和戻り橋)"
 1982: "Friend (ともだち)"
 1983: "Kitayama Longing (北山慕情)"
 1983: "Spread Your Wings (翼ひろげて)"
 1984: "One man band"
 1986: "Stare at (みつめて)"
 1986: "ECHO OF LOVE"
 2003: "I Want to Be Like You (あなたの風になりたい)"

Tie-ups

Songs used in NHK "Songs of Ours"

References

External links 

 
 
 Kamifusen at Oricon

Japanese pop music groups
Japanese folk musicians
Japanese musical duos
Musical groups established in 1974